Fount can refer to:
 The traditional English spelling of the American English font (i.e. typeface)
 A spring or fountain, and thus, metaphorically, a source of something beneficial (as in fount of knowledge, wisdom etc.)
 FOUNT – a publication for Lutheran women
 A fount is also a type of plumbing fixture